Filcas was an Italian professional cycling team that existed only for the 1974 season. The team competed in the 1969 Giro d'Italia, with rider Wilfried Reybrouck winning stage one after attacking the field with 400 metres to go.

References

Defunct cycling teams based in Italy
1974 establishments in Italy
1974 disestablishments in Italy
Cycling teams established in 1974
Cycling teams disestablished in 1974